Jean de Jullienne (né Jean Jullienne; 29 November 1686 — 20 March 1766) was a French textile manufacturer, art collector, and amateur engraver, best remembered as a friend and protector of the painter Antoine Watteau. He was born and died in Paris.

He was the nephew of François Jullienne, who retired from business in 1729 and made Jean manager of the tapestry factory François had set up with his brother-in-law, Jean Glucq, near the Manufacture Royale des Gobelins.

Bibliography
 Dacier, Émile; Vuaflart, Albert; Herold, Jacques (1921–1929). Jean de Julienne et les graveurs de Watteau au XVIII-e siècle (in French). Paris: M. Rousseau. Volumes 1, 2, 3, and 4 available via the Heidelberg University Library repository
 Tillerot, Isabelle (2010). Jean de Jullienne et les collectionneurs de son temps: un regard singulier sur le tableau (in French). Paris: Éditions de la Maison des sciences d l’homme.
 
 Turner, Jane, ed. (1996). "Jullienne, Jean de". The Dictionary of Art. 17. New York: Grove's Dictionaries.  p. 684. .  — via the Internet Archive.
 Vogtherr, Christoph Martin (2011). Jean de Jullienne : Collector & Connoisseur. London: Trustees of the Wallace Collection.

1686 births
1766 deaths
French patrons of the arts
Businesspeople from Paris
Art collectors from Paris